Pilosocereus polygonus is a species of Pilosocereus found in Hispaniola.

References

External links

polygonus